The  Kansas City Chiefs season was the franchise's 22nd season in the National Football League and 32nd overall. They failed to improve on their 11–5 record from 1990 and finished with a 10–6 record. Compared to the Chiefs' 1990 campaign, Steve DeBerg’s consistency had dropped. The running game made up for lost time as Christian Okoye ran for 1,031 yards for the season, Barry Word was productive, and rookie Harvey Williams was outstanding in limited playing time. The Chiefs defeated their division rival, the Los Angeles Raiders in the Wild Card round, resulting in the franchise's first playoff victory since Super Bowl IV in 1970. The next week, the Chiefs lost to the Buffalo Bills in the divisional playoffs.

The season began on July 27 when Jan Stenerud, the hero of Super Bowl IV, was inducted into the Pro Football Hall of Fame.

But the Chiefs rebounded to win four straight games, including an October 7 game in which the Chiefs trounced the Buffalo Bills 33–6. It was the Chiefs' first home Monday Night Football game since 1983. On October 13, The Chiefs blasted the Miami Dolphins 42–7 as Christian Okoye ran for 153 yards.

On December 22, the Chiefs won 27–21 against the Raiders. The victory gave the Chiefs a home playoff game against the team; a loss would have meant playing in Los Angeles again the following week. It was the first playoff game in Kansas City in 20 years.

Quarterback Steve DeBerg completed 14 of 20 passes for 227 yards and 2 touchdowns. Barry Word rushed for 152 yards, and J. J. Birden caught 8 passes for 188 yards and 2 touchdowns. During the game, the Chiefs didn't have to punt and held the ball for almost 40 minutes.

Offseason

NFL draft

Personnel

Staff

Roster

Schedule

Preseason

Regular season 

Note: Intra-division opponents are in bold text.

Postseason

Standings

References 

Kansas City Chiefs
Kansas City Chiefs seasons
Kansas